The traditional Ghanaian stool (or asesedwa in the Asante Twi language) is a carved wooden stool common in sub-Saharan West Africa, and especially common in Ghana. Among the Akan it is used as a household object, it is used in rites of passage, and is considered sacred.

The stool is used as a symbol of chieftaincy (particularly male) in special and private occasions, and is seen as a symbol of royalty, custom and tradition. Queen mothers may be seen in public sitting on the traditional stool as a seat of authority, communicating messages about the nature of leadership. The asesedwa is believed to have religious importance. It is carved into different sizes, shape and design to communicate a specific message of authority. It is important in the Akan tradition because it highlights the sense of community, social and political life, tradition and serving as a symbol of unity and solidarity, believed to bind the souls of their kinsmen together in both the physical and metaphysical worlds. The stool has a great influence on when a leader assumes office and hence a popular term "enstoolment" is used. In Akan, the stool of a leader is so integrally connected to his personality that the expression "a stool has fallen" defines his death. The Golden Stool of the Ashantis is a traditional stool called Sika Dwa which is believed to have a metaphysical origin. The Mampongs have the traditional silver stool.

Crafting 
The conventional stool (asesedwa) is made from the sese wood that gives it the whitish appearance. Other trees such as Bodaa can be used to carve the traditional stool.
 Cut down the specific tree
 cut the trees into logs
 dry the log for about two weeks
 The stool is carved requiring skill and creativity for approximately six to twelve months
 No addition of chemicals but are smoked for pest protection

Appearance and structure 
The traditional stool has a rectangular base with concentric rings of spider in the middle, a central support that communicates the message with figural representations as a symbolism of the stool and a carved seat on the central support where the person of authority sits on.

References 

Ghanaian culture